Manfred Weiss (born 12 February 1935) is a German composer.

Life 
Weiss was born in Niesky (Upper Lusatia). He grew up in a missionary family of the Moravian Church and received violin lessons in Niesky and piano lessons in Görlitz since his childhood. At the age of twelve he composed his first pieces.

After his Abitur, Xeiss studied musical composition with Hans Stieber and music theory with Franz von Glasenapp at the Staatliche Hochschule für Musik Halle/Saale from 1952 to 1955. Minor subjects were piano and viola. From 1955 to 1957 he studied composition with Rudolf Wagner-Régeny and music theory with Ruth Zechlin (harmony), and Jürgen Wilbrandt (counterpoint) at the Hochschule für Musik "Hanns Eisler" in East Berlin. In 1957 he passed his Staatsexamen. His critical remarks about the East German uprising of 1953 prevented him from becoming an aspirant in Berlin. From 1957 to 1959 he was instead  for composition at Rudolf Wagner-Régeny at the Academy of Arts, Berlin. He received further encouragement from Paul Dessau.

In 1959, he was appointed a lecturer on the recommendation of Fritz Reuter and professor in 1983 (from 1991 full professor) for composition and music theory at the Hochschule für Musik Carl Maria von Weber in Dresden. From 1991 to 1997 he was prorector of the University of Music, in whose modernization he played a leading role. He has been emeritus since 1998.

Work 
Weiss composed more than 100 works for orchestra, chamber and choral music as well as songs. sound bodies like the Leipzig Gewandhaus Orchestra, the Sächsische Staatskapelle Dresden, the Dresdner Philharmonie and the Dresdner Kreuzchor performed his compositions. Conductors were among others Herbert Blomstedt, Kurt Masur, Herbert Kegel, Roderich Kreile and Lothar Zagrosek. Among the soloists were the pianist Amadeus Webersinke, the organist Michael Schönheit and the singer Günther Leib.

Main works:
 Konzert für Orgel, Streichorchester und Schlagzeug (1975/76)
 Konzert für Violine und Orchester (1976/77)
 3. Sinfonie (1979/80)
 4. Sinfonie (1986/87)
 5. Sinfonie (1987)

Awards 
 1977:  by the city of Dresden
 1977: Hanns Eisler Prize by Radio DDR
 1977: Hans Stieber Prize by the Komponistenverband of Halle
 1985: Art Prize of the German Democratic Republic

Students 

 Thomas Bloch-Bonhoff (born 1971)
 Ruth Bodenstein-Hoyme (1924–2006)
 Michael Flade (born 1975)
 Reiko Füting (born 1970)
 Gottfried Glöckner (born 1937)
 Berit Handrick
 Eckart Haupt (born 1945)
 Wolfgang Heisig (born 1952)
 Olaf Henzold (born 1960)
 Jörg Herchet (born 1943)
 Rainer Hrasky (born 1943)
 Hans-Dieter Karras (born 1959)
 Ekkehard Klemm (born 1958)
 Robert Linke (born 1958)
 Rainer Lischka (born 1942)
 Rolf Thomas Lorenz (born 1959)
 Christian Münch (born 1951)
 Günter Pistorius (born 1940)
 Heiner Vogt (born 1942)
 Matthias Weißing (born 1960)

Writings 
 Jeder hatte sein eigenes Programm. Die Komponistenklassen der Hochschule für Musik "Carl Maria von Weber" Dresden und ihre Absolventen 1966–1999. In Matthias Herrmann (ed.): Dresden und die avancierte Musik im 20. Jahrhundert.] Bericht über das vom Dresdner Zentrum für Zeitgenössische Musik und vom Institut für Musikwissenschaft der Hochschule für Musik „Carl Maria von Weber“ Dresden veranstaltete Kolloquium. Part 3: 1966–1999, vom 9. bis 11. Oktober 2000 in Dresden. Laaber, Laaber 2004, . (Musik in Dresden, vol. 6)

 Literature 
 Hans Böhm: Junge Komponisten im Profil. Manfred Weiss. In Musik und Gesellschaft, 15, 1965, .
 Hans John: "Lob, Dank, Bitten". Das kirchenmusikalische Vokalschaffen von Manfred Weiss. In Matthias Herrmann (ed.): Die Dresdner Kirchenmusik im 19. und 20. Jahrhundert. (Musik in Dresden 3). Laaber 1998, .
 Weiss, Prof. Manfred. In Wilfried W. Bruchhäuser: Komponisten der Gegenwart im Deutschen Komponisten-Interessenverband. Ein Handbuch. 4th edition, Deutscher Komponisten-Interessenverband, Berlin 1995, .
 Manfred Weiss. In Peter Hollfelder: Geschichte der Klaviermusik. Vol 1, Noetzel, Wilhelmshaven 1989, .
 Christoph Sramek: Weiss, Manfred. In Grove Music Online. Oxford Music Online. 20 August 2012.
 Christoph Sramek: Manfred Weiss. In Komponisten der Gegenwart (KDG). Edition Text & Kritik, Munich 1996, .
 Christoph Sramek: Weiss, Manfred. In Ludwig Finscher (ed.): Die Musik in Geschichte und Gegenwart (MGG). vol. 17, Bärenreiter, Kassel [among others] 2007, .
 Über Weiss-Aufführungen des Dresdner Kreuzchores, in Matthias Herrmann (ed.): Dresdner Kreuzchor und zeitgenössische Chormusik. Ur- und Erstaufführungen zwischen Richter und Kreile''.

References

External links 
 Manfred Weiss' website
 
 Manfred Weiss in der MusicSack-Datenbank
 Manfred Weiss, KDG – Komponisten der Gegenwart, in Munzinger-Archiv (Beginning of article free)
 Manfred Weiss in Komponisten in Dresden
 Manfred Weiss im Archiv Zeitgenössischer Komponisten der Sächsischen Landesbibliothek – Staats- und Universitätsbibliothek Dresden

1935 births
Living people
People from Görlitz (district)
20th-century classical composers
20th-century German composers